Hamilton is a 1998 Swedish action film directed by Harald Zwart and starring Peter Stormare, Mark Hamill and Lena Olin. The film was edited with additional scenes into a 3-hour-long TV series in 2001. The 1998 single "No Man's Land" by Ardis was included in the soundtrack to this film.

Synopsis
Swedish military intelligence officers Carl Hamilton (Peter Stormare) and Åke Stålhandske (Mats Långbacka) are ordered to eliminate a band of Russian smugglers on the Russian tundra. The smugglers possess a nuclear missile, a 1.5 megaton SS-20, "enough to turn Paris, Washington or New York to ashes". What they do not know is that the smugglers they have intercepted were only a decoy, while the real missile was shipped to Libya. Mike Hawkins (Mark Hamill), the film's antagonist, is an American former CIA officer working in Murmansk, who is also looking for the nuclear missile and joins Hamilton's team.

Cast
Peter Stormare as Carl Hamilton
Lena Olin as Tessie
Mark Hamill as Mike Hawkins
Mats Långbacka as Åke Stålhandske 
Terry Carter as Texas Slim

Production
The Statoil company paid 500,000 NOK ($USD67,000) for their logo to be displayed for three seconds in the film. Mark Hamill accidentally hit Peter Stormare during the last fight scene.

External links
 
 
 

1998 films
1998 directorial debut films
1990s English-language films
English-language Swedish films
Films based on Swedish novels
Films directed by Harald Zwart
1990s Russian-language films
1990s Swedish-language films
1998 thriller films
Swedish thriller films
1998 multilingual films
Swedish multilingual films
1990s Swedish films